Wiederhören is the sixth album by the German Krautrock band Kraan. It is the first album after the departure of Johannes Pappert from the band.

Track listing
All songs composed by Kraan.

Side one
 "Just One Way" – 4:00
 "Vollgas ahoi" – 6:07
 "Silky Way" – 3:58
 "Rendezvous in Blue" – 5:56

Side two
 "Let's Take a Ride" – 5:19
 "Rund um die Uhr" – 3:45
 "Yaqui Yagua" – 5:19
 "Wiederhören"  – 7:13

Revisited Records 2005 CD Release Bonus Track
 "Ein Wiederhören mit einem Bass Solo" - 19:28

Personnel
 Peter Wolbrandt – guitar and vocals
 Jan Fride – drums
 Helmut Hattler – bass
 Ingo Bischof – keyboards

Guest musician
 Tommy Goldschmidt – congas and percussion on "Just One Way", "Rund um die Uhr" and "Let's Take A Ride"

References

External links
 

1977 albums
Kraan albums
EMI Records albums